B2M may refer to:

 B2M (band), a musical band from the Tiwi Islands, Northern Territory, Australia
 B2M Entertainment, a South Korean music label
 Beta-2 microglobulin, a gene or protein
 Boyz II Men American R&B music group
 Business to many, businesses and consumers in marketing
 D'Entrecasteaux-class patrol ship, a French Navy ship type designated as Bâtiment multi-mission (B2M)
 Mitsubishi B2M, an aircraft